Sel is a municipality in Innlandet county, Norway.

Sel may also refer to:

 Sel (given name), a list of people with the given name
 HNoMS Sel, three Royal Norwegian Navy boats
 Sel (group), a Lithuanian band
 "Sel" (song), from the 2019 album Dawn Chorus by Jacques Greene
 Sel, abbreviation of Selenipedium, a genus of the orchid family

See also
 Cell (disambiguation)
 SEL (disambiguation)
 Sell (disambiguation)